In Rolling Waves is the second studio album by New Zealand indie electronic band The Naked and Famous. It was released on 13 September 2013 by Fiction Records and Island Records. On 23 July 2013, the album's lead single, "Hearts Like Ours", premiered on BBC Radio 1. The music video premiered on 29 July 2013.

Touring
Following the release of the album, the band toured the United States with Orange County alternative rock band The Colourist.

Track listing

Personnel
Credits adapted from the liner notes of In Rolling Waves.

 Thom Powers – production ; string arrangements 
 Aaron Short – production 
 Justin Meldal-Johnsen – production 
 Billy Bush – engineering
 David Schwerkolt – engineering assistance
 Alan Moulder – mixing
 John Catlin – mix engineering
 Andrew Bulbrook – string arrangements 
 The Calder Quartet – strings 
 Benjamin Jacobson – violin
 Andrew Bulbrook – violin
 Jonathan Moerschel – viola
 Eric Byers – cello
 Joe LaPorta – mastering
 Joel Kefali – artwork

Charts

Release history

References

2013 albums
Albums produced by Justin Meldal-Johnsen
Fiction Records albums
Island Records albums
The Naked and Famous albums
Republic Records albums